The Diocese of Niagara is one of thirty regional divisions in the Anglican Church of Canada. The see city of the diocese is Hamilton, with the bishop's cathedra located at Christ's Church Cathedral on James Street North. Located within the ecclesiastical province of Ontario, it borders the Dioceses of Huron and Toronto. The area enclosed by the Diocese of Niagara includes much of the Golden Horseshoe, and moves north to include Erin and Orangeville as far as Shelburne. Moving sharply south the line includes Mount Forest and widens, south-westerly to include Elora and Guelph. Skirting Brantford and the Territory of the Six Nations Confederacy, the line then travels, again, south-westerly to Nanticoke and Lake Erie to include the entire Niagara Peninsula. Major urban centres within its borders are St. Catharines, Niagara Falls, Hamilton, Guelph, Oakville, Milton, Burlington, and Orangeville.

The current bishop of Niagara is The Right Reverend Susan Bell, who succeeded The Right Reverend Michael Bird as diocesan bishop on June 1, 2018.  She was elected bishop by the synod of the Diocese of Niagara in March 2018, and consecrated and installed as a bishop in May of that year.

There are just over 80 parishes within the diocese served by approximately 120 licensed parish priests, with a number of honorary clergy, vocational deacons and licensed lay people. The diocese is divided into five regional deaneries: Brock, Lincoln, Hamilton-Haldimand, Greater Wellington and Trafalgar. Each deanery is overseen by a regional archdeacon and regional dean.

Early history
The first Anglican presence in what would become the Diocese of Niagara begin with St Mark's Church in Newark (now Niagara-on-the-Lake), the former capital of Upper Canada. The parish was founded in 1790 as Loyalist immigrants arrived from the former American colonies, in what would become the province of Ontario. At this time the area was part of the Diocese of Nova Scotia, and subsequently became part of the Diocese of Quebec, then of the Diocese of Toronto.

The diocese was formed by an act of the Legislative Assembly of Upper Canada; 39 Vic Chapter 107 in 1875. Royal assent was given in 1876. The first bishop was Thomas Brock Fuller, Archdeacon of Niagara and godson of Sir Isaac Brock, the hero of the Battle of Queenston Heights.

Parishes by Region

Region of Greater Wellington
St. Alban the Martyr, Acton
Grace Church, Arthur
St. John, Elora
All Saints, Erin
St. James, Fergus
All Saints Lutheran Anglican Church, Guelph
Church of the Apostles (St. James & St. Matthias), Guelph
St. George, Guelph
St. Paul, Mount Forest
St. Mark, Orangeville
St. John, Rockwood
St. Paul's Church, Shelburne

Region of Trafalgar

St. Christopher, Burlington
St. Elizabeth, Burlington
St. John, Burlington
St. Luke, Burlington
St. Matthew on-the-Plains, Burlington
St. George's, Georgetown
St. Alban the Martyr, Glen Williams
St. Stephen, Hornby
St. George Church Lowville, Campbellville
Grace, Milton
St. John, Campbellville (Nassagaweya)
St. Paul, Norval
The Church of the Epiphany, Oakville
Church of the Incarnation, Oakville
St. Aidan, Oakville
St. Cuthbert, Oakville
St. Jude, Oakville
St. Simon, Oakville
St. Luke, Oakville
St. John, Stewarttown
Grace, Waterdown

Region of Hamilton-Haldimand
St. John, Ancaster
St. Paul, Caledonia
St. John the Divine, Cayuga
St. John, Cheapside
St. James, Dundas
St. Paul, Dunnville
The Dunn Parish: Christ Church & St John the Evangelist, Dunnville
Christ Church, Flamborough
All Saints, Hamilton
Christ's Church Cathedral, Hamilton
Church of the Nativity, Hamilton
Church of the Resurrection, Hamilton
St. John the Evangelist, Hamilton
St. Michael, Hamilton
St. Paul (Westdale), Hamilton
St. Stephen on the Mount, Hamilton
St. Paul, Jarvis
The Church of the Ascension, Hamilton
St. Paul (Glanford), Mount Hope
The Church of Our Saviour The Redeemer, Stoney Creek
St. John the Evangelist, Winona
Christ Church, Woodburn (Hannon)

Region of Lincoln
St. Alban, Beamsville
St. Andrew, Grimsby
St. John, Jordan
Christ Church, McNab
St. Mark, Niagara-on-the-Lake
St. Saviour, The Brock Memorial Church, Queenston
St. Luke, Smithville
St. Barnabas, St. Catharines
St. Columba, St. Catharines
St. George, St. Catharines
St. John, (Port Dalhousie) St. Catharines 
St. Thomas, St. Catharines
Transfiguration, St. Catharines
St. John the Evangelist, Thorold

Region of Brock
Holy Trinity, Fonthill
St. Paul, Fort Erie
Christ Church, Niagara Falls
Holy Trinity (Chippawa), Niagara Falls
St. John the Evangelist, Niagara Falls
The Parish of St. James and St. Brendan, Port Colborne
St. John, Ridgemount
All Saints, Ridgeway
Christ Church, Wainfleet
All Saints Church (Dain City), Welland
Holy Trinity, Welland
St. David, Welland

Educational institutions
Appleby College, Oakville, founded 1911.
St. Mildred's-Lightbourn School, Oakville, founded as St. Mildred's College, Toronto, 1908.
Ridley College, St. Catharines, founded 1889.
St. John's-Kilmarnock School, Breslau, founded 1972

The diocese also has connections to campus ministries at three universities in its jurisdiction. The University of Guelph, Brock University and McMaster University all have chaplains whose ministries are affiliated with the Diocese of Niagara and its ecumenical partners.

Diocesan Bishops of Niagara
 Thomas Fuller, 1875–1884
 Charles Hamilton, 1884–1896
 Philip Du Moulin, 1896–1911
 William Clark, 1911–1925
 Derwyn Owen, 1925–1932  Primate of All Canada, 1934–1947
 Lewis Broughall, 1932–1949
 Walter Bagnall, 1949-1973
 John Bothwell, 1973–1991 Archbishop of Niagara and Metropolitan of Ontario, 1985–1991
 Walter Asbil, 1991–1997
 Ralph Spence, 1998–2008
 Michael Bird, 2008–2018
 Susan Bell, 2018–present

Litigation
The diocese was involved with litigation against several former parishes affiliated with Anglican Network in Canada. The courts have generally upheld the diocese as owner of the church buildings and ejected the illegally assumed leadership.

References

External links

 Anglican Diocese of Niagara
 Anglican Church of Canada

Religious organizations established in 1875
Niagara, Anglican Diocese of
Regional Municipality of Niagara
Anglican Church in Ontario
Anglican dioceses established in the 19th century
Anglican bishops of Niagara
Deans of Niagara
1875 establishments in Ontario
Anglican Province of Ontario